The Great Escape Festival is a three-day music festival held in Brighton and Hove, England every year in May. It is operated by MAMA Festivals and showcases new music from a variety of genres. The festival was founded in 2006 and roughly hosts 300 bands across 30 venues throughout the city. It has been likened to South by Southwest.

There is also a music industry convention section to the event, which is attended by over 3000 delegates. The 2011-2014 conferences have been programmed by the team from music industry publication CMU. Speakers have included Michael Eavis, DJ Shadow, Paul Epworth, and representatives of companies such as Beggars Group, Ticketmaster, PRS for Music, Universal Music Group and Topspin.

In addition to the main festival, there is also The Alternative Escape, a further strand of 'unofficial' shows.

The headliner in 2015 was Alabama Shakes.

There was no event in 2020, and the festival was held in 2021 but was entirely online, both due to the COVID-19 pandemic.

See also
 Music of Sussex

References

External links
 
The Guardian's Great Escape festival page

Rock festivals in England
Music festivals established in 2006
Music in Brighton and Hove
Festivals in Brighton and Hove
2006 establishments in England
Music festivals in East Sussex